Bradford Reed is an American multi-instrumentalist, experimental luthier, and member of the avant-garde band King Missile III. In the 1980s he invented the pencilina, a custom made string instrument.

Pencilina
The pencilina is a custom-made string instrument that Reed invented in the 1980s. The instrument is a double neck 3rd bridge guitar.

The pencilina is similar in construction to two long connected thin zithers. Its two "necks" each have a bridge, tuning pegs, and a set of strings; six strings on one neck and four on the other. Both are open tuned. The treble tuning is adjustable via a multiple tuning bridge. Wedged over and under the strings is a wooden drum stick for the treble/alto/tenor strings and a metal rod for the bass strings, which divide each string into two segments with different pitches. The divided strings can be then played separately, resulting in various harmonic overtones. There are four built-in pickups: two are contact mics mounted in the bridges at one end of each neck, and two are guitar-style electromagnetic pickups which are placed under the strings toward the opposite end. It's played by striking its strings with sticks and may also be plucked or bowed.

The Pencilina was featured on the book/album Orbitones, Spoonharps and Bellowphones (Elipsis Arts) and is described in Nice Noise by Bart Hopkin and Yuri Landman.

Discography

References

External links
Bradford Reed's Instagram Feed
Bradford Reed's YouTube Channel
Bradford Reed's old site

Inventors of musical instruments
American lutenists
King Missile members
Year of birth missing (living people)
Living people